Binetti is a surname. Notable people with this surname include:

 Cosimo Binetti, member of Italian progressive metal/power metal band The Dogma
 Damiano Binetti (born 1968), Italian conductor
 Laura Binetti (born 1965), Canadian bodybuilder
 Paola Binetti (born 1943), Italian politician
 Steve Binetti (born 1966), German composer and musician